The United States had an official estimated resident population of 333,287,557 on July 1, 2022, according to the U.S. Census Bureau. This figure includes the 50 states and the District of Columbia but excludes the population of five unincorporated U.S. territories (Puerto Rico, Guam, the U.S. Virgin Islands, American Samoa, and the Northern Mariana Islands) as well as several minor island possessions. The United States is the third most populous country in the world. The Census Bureau showed a population increase of 0.4% for the twelve-month period ending in July 2022, below the world average annual rate of 0.9%. The total fertility rate in the United States estimated for 2021 is 1.664 children per woman, which is below the replacement fertility rate of approximately 2.1.

The U.S. population almost quadrupled during the 20th centuryat a growth rate of about 1.3% a yearfrom about 76 million in 1900 to 281 million in 2000. It is estimated to have reached the 200 million mark in 1967, and the 300 million mark on October 17, 2006. Foreign-born immigration caused the U.S. population to continue its rapid increase, with the foreign-born population doubling from almost 20 million in 1990 to over 45 million in 2015, representing one-third of the population increase. The U.S. population grew by 1.6 million from 2018 to 2019, with 38% of growth from immigration. Population growth is fastest among minorities as a whole, and according to the Census Bureau's estimation for 2020, 50% of U.S. children under the age of 18 are members of ethnic minority groups.

As of 2020, white people numbered 235,411,507 or 71% of the population, including people who identified as white in combination with another race. People who identified as white alone (including Hispanic whites) numbered 204,277,273 or 61.6% of the population and Non-Latino whites made up 57.8% of the country's population.

Latino Americans accounted for 51.1% of the total national population growth between 2010 and 2020, increasing from 50.5 million in 2010 to 62.1 million in 2020. The Hispanic or Latino population increased by 23% between 2010 and 2020, an increase of more than 11.6 million. Immigrants and their U.S.-born descendants are expected to provide most of the U.S. population gains in the decades ahead.

In 2020, it was reported that 51.0% of births were to non-Hispanic white mothers. In 2021, the percentage increased to 51.5%.

The 12 month ending general fertility rate increased from 56.6 to 57.0 in 2022 Q1 compared to 2021 Q4.

Population
On April 1, 2020, the United States had a population of 331,449,281, according to the 2020 United States census.

The following demographic statistics are from the CIA World Factbook estimated , unless otherwise indicated.

Note: Population estimate of United States excluding oversea armed forces.<ref name=":0"

Age and sex distribution

Age distribution by selected age groups.

 0 – 14 years: 18.2%
 15 – 24 years: 13.0%
 25 – 54 years: 39.0%
 55 – 64 years: 12.9%
 65 years and over: 16.8%

The median age of the total population as of 2021 is 38.8 years; the male median age is 37.7 years; the female median age is 39.8 years.

Birth rate
 12.023 births/1,000 population (2023) Country comparison to the world: 151th

Death rate
 10.45 deaths/1,000 population (2021 est.) Country comparison to the world: 78th
 8.81 deaths/1,000 population (2021 est)* *age-adjusted death rate

Total fertility rate

In 1800 the average U.S. woman had 7.04 children; by the first decade of the 1900s, this number had already decreased to 3.56. Since the early 1970s the birth rate has been below the replacement rate of 2.1 with 1.72 children per woman in 2018.

The drop in the U.S. fertility rate from 2.08 per woman in 2007 to 1.76 in 2017 was mostly due to the declining birth rate of Hispanics, teenagers, and young women, although the birth rate for older women rose.
 1.664 children born/woman (2021).

Mother's mean age at first birth

 27.1 years (2020 est.)

Dependency ratio 
The dependency ratio is the age-population ratio of people who are normally not in the labor force (the dependent population, which includes those aged 0 to 14 and 65 and older) to those who are (the productive part ages 15 to 64). It is used to gauge the strain on the populace that is productive.

 Total dependency ratio: 54.03 (2021) Country comparison to the world*: 110th 
 Child dependency ratio: 28.11 (2021) Country comparison to the world*: 138th
 Aged dependency ratio: 25.92 (2021) Country comparison to the world*: 42nd
 Potential support ratio: 3.86 (2021) Country comparison to the world*: 160th
*Ratios are ranked from highest to lowest by country

Life expectancy

 Total population: 76.1 years for a child born in 2021, decreasing from 77.0 years in 2020.
 Male: 73.2 years (2021), 74.2 years (2020)
 Female: 79.9 years (2021), 79.9 years (2020)

The average life expectancy in the United States has been on a decline since 2014. The Centers for Disease Control and Prevention cites three main reasons: a 72% increase in overdoses in the last decade (including a 30% increase in opioid overdoses from July 2016 to September 2017, but did not differentiate between accidental overdose with a legal prescription and overdose with opioids obtained illegally and/or combined with illegal drugs i.e., heroin, cocaine, methamphetamine, etc.), a ten-year increase in liver disease (the rate for men age 25 to 34 increased by 8% per year; for women, by 11% per year), and a 33% increase in suicide rates since 1999.<ref name=cnbc

From 2019 to 2020, the COVID-19 pandemic contributed to approximately 61% of the decrease in life expectancy in the United States. While increases in mortality from unintentional injuries, heart disease, homicide, and diabetes contributed to 11.7%, 5.8%, 2.9%, and 2.8% of the decrease in life expectancy from 2019 to 2020, respectively. Life expectancy has also varied by racial and ethnic group, with Non-Hispanic Asians having the highest life expectancy and Non-Hispanic American Indians having the lowest. In 2021, life expectancy at birth in the United States fell for the second year in a row, the first two-year drop since 1961-1963.

NOTE: Life expectancy at birth data for 2021 are provisional.*
 NH = Non-hispanic.
 LEB = Life expectancy at birth 
 Growth arrows (/) indicate an increase or decrease in total life expectancy compared to years before.

Life Tables

Density

The most densely populated state is New Jersey (1,263/mi2 or 488/km2).

The population is highly urbanized, with 82.3% of the population residing in cities and suburbs. Large urban clusters are spread throughout the eastern half of the United States (particularly the Great Lakes area, northeast, east, and southeast) and the western tier states; mountainous areas, principally the Rocky Mountains and Appalachian chain, deserts in the southwest, the dense boreal forests in the extreme north, and the central prairie states are less densely populated; Alaska's population is concentrated along its southern coast – with particular emphasis on the city of Anchorage – and Hawaii's is centered on the island of Oahu. California and Texas are the most populous states, as the mean center of U.S. population has consistently shifted westward and southward. New York City is the most populous city in the United States and has been since at least 1790.

In the U.S. territories, population centers include the San Juan metro area in Puerto Rico, Saipan in the Northern Mariana Islands, and the island of Tutuila in American Samoa.

Growth rate
 Population growth rate: 0.12%. Country comparison to the world: 130th

Births and fertility by race
A total of 3,659,289 babies were born in 2021, a 1% increase from 2020. Additionally, researchers also looked at births by race and found that White and Hispanic women each saw the number of births increase by about 2% from 2020 to 2021. Meanwhile, Black and Asian women saw the number of births decline by 2.4% and 2.5%, respectively, over the same period, while American Indian/Alaskan Native women saw their numbers fall by 3.2%. It also marks the first rise in births since 2014. Prior to this report, the total number of births had been decreasing by an average of 2% per year. However, the total fertility rate (the number of births a hypothetical group of 1,000 people would have over their lifetimes) was 1,663.5 births per 1,000 women. This is still below the replacement level, the level a population needs to replace itself, which is 2,100 births per 1,000 women.

U.S.-born people

Note: Hispanics are counted both by their ethnicity and by their race, giving a higher overall number. Also note that growth arrows indicate an increase or decrease in the number of births, not in the fertility rate.

NOTE:
 NH = Non-hispanic.
 TFR = Total fertility rate (number of children born per woman).
 Growth arrows (/) indicate an increase or decrease in the number of births, not in the fertility rate, comparing to the previous year.

Percent of births to White Non-Hispanic women that were their 8th+ child, by US state, in 2021
New York: 2.21%, New Jersey: 1.7%, Wisconsin: 1.04%, Arkansas: 1.02%, Montana: 0.86%, Ohio: 0.85%, Iowa: 0.84%, Pennsylvania: 0.82%, Kansas: 0.76%, Kentucky: 0.76%, Utah: 0.75%, Minnesota: 0.75%, Indiana: 0.72%, Wyoming: 0.72%, Mississippi: 0.7%, Michigan: 0.7%, Idaho 0.65%, West Virginia: 0.64%, Arizona: 0.62%, North Dakota 0.59%, South Dakota 0.54%, Arkansas 0.51%, New Mexico: 0.50%, Maryland: 0.49%, Oregon: 0.46%, Michigan: 0.44%, Oklahoma: 0.44%, Florida: 0.43%, Tennessee: 0.42%, Virginia: 0.41%, Illinois: 0.40%, Nevada: 0.40%, West Virginia: 0.39%, Delaware: 0.38%, Georgia: 0.36%, Nebraska: 0.36%, Texas: 0.33%, Alabama: 0.33%, Missouri: 0.32%, Vermont: 0.31%, South Carolina: 0.30%, California: 0.29%, Colorado: 0.29%, North Carolina: 0.25%, Alaska: 0.25%, Connecticut: 0.20%, New Hampshire: 0.19%, Massachusetts: 0.17%.

Immigration

In 2017, out of the U.S. foreign-born population, some 45% (20.7 million) were naturalized citizens, 27% (12.3 million) were lawful permanent residents (including many eligible to become citizens), 6% (2.2 million) were temporary lawful residents, and 23% (10.5 million) were unauthorized immigrants. Among current living immigrants to the U.S., the top five countries of birth are Mexico (25% of immigrants), China (6%), India (6%), the Philippines (5%) and El Salvador (3%). Some 13% of current living immigrants come from Europe and Canada, and 10% from the Caribbean. Among new arrivals, Asian immigrants have been more numerous than Hispanic immigrants since 2010; in 2017, 37.4% of immigrant arrivals were Asian, and 26.6% were Hispanic. Until 2017 and 2018, the United States led the world in refugee resettlement for decades, admitting more refugees than the rest of the world combined. From fiscal year 1980 until 2017, 55% of refugees came from Asia, 27% from Europe, 13% from Africa, and 4% from Latin America, fleeing war and persecution.
 Net migration rate (2022): 3.02 migrants/1,000 population. Country comparison to the world: 35th
 Net migration rate* (2020-2021): 0.73 migrants/1,000 population.
*(mid-year estimates)

As of 2017, 13.6% (44.4 million) of the population was foreign born – an increase from 4.7% in 1970 but less than the 1890 record of 14.8%. 45% of the foreign born population were naturalized US citizens. 23% (10.3 million) of the foreign born community is undocumented, accounting for 3.2% of the total population. According to the 2010 census, Latin America and the Caribbean is the largest region-of-birth group, accounting for 53% of the foreign born population. As of 2018 this region is still the largest source of immigrants to the United States In 2018, there were almost 90 million immigrants and U.S. born children of immigrants (second-generation Americans) in the United States, accounting for 28% of the overall U.S. population. In 2018, 1,096,611 immigrants were granted either permanent or temporary legal residence in the United States

Vital statistics

U.S. demographic table, 1935–2021

Current vital statistics

U.S. projected population table, 2017–2060 

The United States Census Bureau's 2017 projections were produced using the cohort-component method. In the cohort-component method, the components of population change (fertility, mortality, and net migration) are projected separately for each birth cohort (persons born in a given year). The base population is advanced each year by using projected survival rates and net international migration. Each year, a new birth cohort is added to the population by applying the projected fertility rates to the female population.

Since 1790 

In 1900, when the U.S. population was 76 million, there were 66.8 million white Americans in the United States, representing 88% of the total population, 8.8 million Black Americans, with about 90% of them still living in Southern states, and slightly more than 500,000 Hispanics.

Under the law, the Immigration and Nationality Act of 1965, the number of first-generation immigrants living in the United States has increased, from 9.6 million in 1970 to about 38 million in 2007. Around a million people legally immigrated to the United States per year in the 1990s, up from 250,000 per year in the 1950s.

In 1900, non-Hispanic whites comprised almost 97% of the population of the 10 largest U.S. cities. The Census Bureau reported that minorities (including Hispanic whites) made up 50.4% of the children born in the U.S. between July 2010 and July 2011, compared to 37% in 1990.

In 2014, the state with the lowest fertility rate was Rhode Island, with a rate of 1.56, while Utah had the greatest rate with a rate of 2.33. This correlates with the ages of the states' populations: Rhode Island has the ninth-oldest median age in the US39.2while Utah has the youngest29.0.

In 2017, the U.S. birth rate remains well below the replacement level needed – at least 2.1 children per woman so as not to experience population decreases – as white American births fell in all 50 states and the District of Columbia. Among non-Hispanic white women, no states had a fertility rate above the replacement level. Among non-Hispanic Black women, 12 states reached above the replacement level needed. Among Hispanic women, 29 states did. For non-Hispanic white women, the highest total fertility rate was in Utah, at 2.099, and the lowest in the District of Columbia, at 1.012. Among non-Hispanic Black women, the highest total fertility rate was in Maine, at 4.003, and the lowest in Wyoming, at 1.146. For Hispanic women, the highest total fertility rate was in Alabama, at 3.085, and the lowest in Vermont, at 1.200, and Maine, at 1.281. Due to the aging and low birth rates among white people, deaths now outnumber births among white people (non-Hispanic) in more than half the states in the country.

In 2018, U.S. births fell to the lowest level in 32 years.

Median age of the population
Median age of the U.S. population through history. Source: U.S. Department of Commerce. Bureau of Census, United States Census Bureau and The World Factbook.

Vital statistics

The U.S. total fertility rate as of 2020 is 1.641
 1.86 for white Americans (including White Hispanics)
 1.55 for non-Hispanic whites
 1.71 for non-Hispanic Blacks
 1.65 for Native Americans (including Hispanics)
 1.53 for Asian Americans (including Hispanics)
Other:
 1.88 for Hispanics (of all racial groups)

(Note that ≈95% of Hispanics are included as "white Hispanics" by CDC, which does not recognize the Census's "Some other race" category and counts people in that category as white.)

Source: National Vital statistics report based on 2010 US Census data

Total Fertility Rates from 1800 to 2010
The total fertility rate is the number of children born per woman. Sources: Ansley J. Coale, Zelnik and National Center for Health Statistics.

Life expectancy at birth from 1901 to 2015 
Life expectancy in the United States from 1901 to 2015. Source: Our World In Data and the United Nations.

1901–1950

1901–2015

Source: UN World Population Prospects

Percent distribution of the total population by age: 1900 to 2015

Sources: U.S. Census Bureau, U.S. Department of Commerce, United Nations medium variant projections.

Population centers

The United States has dozens of major cities, including 31 "global cities" of all types, with 10 in the "alpha" group of global cities: New York, Los Angeles, Chicago, Washington, D.C., Boston, San Francisco, Miami, Philadelphia, Dallas, and Atlanta. , the United States had 56 metropolitan areas with 1 million or more inhabitants. (The U.S. Census Bureau ranked Urban Honolulu as the 56th most populous area, with just over 1 million residents. See Table of United States Metropolitan Statistical Areas.)

, about 250 million Americans live in or around urban areas. That means more than three-quarters of the U.S. population shares just about three percent of the U.S. land area.

The following table shows the populations of the top twenty metropolitan areas. Note Denver and Baltimore have over 2.5 million residents in their metro areas, and the San Juan (Puerto Rico) metro area has more than 2 million residents.

Race and ethnicity

Race

The United States Census Bureau collects racial data in accordance with guidelines provided by the U.S. Office of Management and Budget (OMB), and these data are based on self-identification. Many other countries count multiple races based on origin while America compiles multiple dozens of ethnicity groups into skin color grouping them together. The racial classifications and definitions used by the U.S. Census Bureau are:
 White: a person having origins in any of the original peoples of Europe, the Middle East, or North Africa. It includes people who indicate their race as "White" or report entries such as Afghan, English, Iranian, Irish, German, Italian, Portuguese, Lebanese, Arab, Moroccan, or Caucasian.
 Black or African American: a person having origins in any of the Black racial groups of Africa. It includes people who indicate their race as "Black, African Am." or report entries such as African American, Kenyan, Nigerian, or Haitian.
 American Indian or Alaska Native: a person having origins in any of the original peoples of North and South America (including Central America) and who maintains tribal affiliation or community attachment. This category includes people who indicate their race as "American Indian or Alaska Native" or report entries such as Navajo, Blackfeet, Inupiat, Yup'ik, Central American Indian groups, or South American Indian groups.
 Asian: a person having origins in any of the original peoples of the Far East, Southeast Asia, or the Indian subcontinent including, for example: Bangladesh, Cambodia, China, India, Japan, Malaysia, Pakistan, the Philippines, South Korea, Taiwan, Thailand, and Vietnam.
 Native Hawaiian or Other Pacific Islander: a person having origins in any of the original peoples of Hawaii, Guam, Samoa, or other Pacific Islands.
 Some other race: includes all other responses not included in the "White," "Black or African American," "American Indian or Alaska Native," "Asian," and "Native Hawaiian or other Pacific Islander" racial categories described above includes Asians from Western Asia or Russia (non European Russia) and White Africans
 Two or more races: people may choose to provide two or more races either by checking two or more race response check boxes, providing multiple responses, or some combination of check boxes and other responses.

Data about race and ethnicity are self-reported to the Census Bureau. Since the 2000 census, Congress has authorized people to identify themselves according to more than one racial classification by selecting more than one category. Only one ethnicity may be selected, however, because the U.S. Census recognizes only two ethnicitiesHispanic and Non-Hispanicwhich are mutually exclusive since you can be one or the other, but not both. The Census Bureau defines "Hispanic" as any person who has an ancestral connection to Latin America.

According to the United States Census Bureau website, the racial composition of the United States in 2021 was:

According to the 2013–2017 American Community Survey, the racial composition of the United States in 2017 was:

Distribution of Total Population by Race, 1900 to 2020 (in %)
Hispanic are shown like part of the races. Source: U.S. Census Bureau.

*Data are shown for the White, Black or African American, American Indian and Alaska Native, Asian and Native Hawaiian and Other Pacific Islander, and Some other race alone populations.

Median age by each race alone & ethnicity, 2021
Source: United States Census Bureau.

Median age by race alone or in combination & ethnicity, 2021 
Source: United States Census Bureau.

Hispanic or Latino origin

The U.S. Office of Management and Budget (OMB) defines "Hispanic or Latino" as a person of Cuban, Mexican, Puerto Rican, Dominican, South or Central American, or other Spanish culture or origin regardless of race. People who identify with the terms "Hispanic" or "Latino" are those who classify themselves in one of the specific Hispanic or Latino categories listed on the decennial census questionnaire and various Census Bureau survey questionnaires – "Mexican, Mexican Am., Chicano" or "Puerto Rican" or "Cuban" – as well as those who indicate that they are "another Hispanic, Latino, or Spanish origin." People who identify their origin as Hispanic or Latino may be of any race.

Population distribution by Hispanic origin 1970–2020 (in %)
Source: U.S. Census Bureau, decennial census of population, 1970 (5-percent
sample), 1980 to 2020.

Median age of each race alone, 2021 (Hispanic)
Source: United States Census Bureau.

Median age of each race alone or in combination, 2021 (Hispanic)
Source: United States Census Bureau.

Note: Hispanic origin is considered an ethnicity, not a race. Hispanics may be of any race.

Indigenous peoples

As of 2017, there are 2,098,763 American Indian and Alaska Native people in the United States, representing 0.7% of the U.S. population. There are 573 federally recognized tribal governments in the United States. As of 2000, the largest groups in the United States by population were Navajo, Cherokee, Choctaw, Sioux, Chippewa, Apache, Blackfeet, Iroquois, and Pueblo.

Other groups
There were 22.1 million veterans in 2009, meaning that less than 10% of Americans served in the Armed Forces.

In 2010, The Washington Post estimated that there were 11 million undocumented immigrants in the country. As of 2017, Pew Research reported that there an estimated 10.5 million undocumented immigrants in the U.S.

There were about 2 million people in prison in 2010.

Projections

A report by the U.S. Census Bureau projects a decrease in the ratio of Whites between 2010 and 2050, from 79.5% to 74.0%. At the same time, Non-Hispanic Whites are projected to no longer make up a majority of the population by 2045, but will remain the largest single ethnic group. In 2050 they will compose 46.3% of the population. Non-Hispanic whites made up 85% of the population in 1960. However, white Americans overall are still projected to make up over 70% of the population in 2050.

The report foresees the Hispanic or Latino population rising from 16% today to 30% by 2050, the Black percentage barely rising from 13.2% to 14.4%, and Asian Americans upping their 4.6% share to 7.8%. The United States had a population of 310 million people in October 2010, and is projected to reach 400 million by 2039 and 439 million in 2050. It is further projected that 82% of the increase in population from 2005 to 2050 will be due to immigrants and their children.

Of the nation's children in 2050, 62% are expected to be of a minority ethnicity, up from 44% today. Approximately 39% are projected to be Hispanic or Latino (up from 22% in 2008), and 38% are projected to be single-race, non-Hispanic Whites (down from 56% in 2008). Racial and ethnic minorities surpassed non-Hispanic whites as the largest group of U.S. children under 5 years old in 2015.

Pew Research Center projections
The United Nations projects a population of just over 400 million in 2060.

The country's racial profile will be vastly different, and although whites will remain the single largest ethnic group in the U.S., they will no longer be a majority excluding White Hispanics by 2055 according to Pew Research Center. Growth in the Hispanic and Asian populations is predicted to almost triple over the next 40 years. By 2055, the breakdown is estimated to be 48% non-Hispanic white, 24% Hispanic, 16% Black, and 14% Asian.

, 14% of the United States' population is foreign born, compared to just 5% in 1965. Nearly 39 million immigrants have come to the U.S. since 1965, with most coming from Asia and Latin America. The 2015 Census Report predicts that the percentage of the U.S. population that is foreign-born will continue to increase, reaching 19% by 2060. This increase in the foreign-born population will account for a large share of the overall population growth.

The average person in the U.S. of 2060 is likely to be older than the average person of 2018 today, and almost one in four people will be 65 or older.

U.S. Census Census Bureau projections

Percent minority 1970–2042 (2008 projections)

Note: "Minority" refers to people who reported their ethnicity and race as something other than non-Hispanic White alone in the decennial census.

Total US population

Religion

Religious affiliations

The table below is based mainly on selected data as reported to the United States Census Bureau. It only includes the voluntary self-reported membership of religious bodies with 750,000 or more. The definition of a member is determined by each religious body. , the US census bureau reported that about 13% of the population did not identify themselves as a member of any religion.

In a Pew Research Survey performed in 2012, Americans without a religion (atheists, agnostics, nothing in particular, etc.) approached the numbers of Evangelical Protestant Americans with almost 20% of Americans being nonreligious (compared to just over 26% being Evangelical Protestant). If this current growth rate continues, by 2050, around 51% of Americans will not have a religion.

Surveys conducted in 2014 and 2019 by Pew indicated that the percentage of Americans unaffiliated with a religion increased from 16% in 2007 to 23% in 2014 and 26% of the population in 2019.

According to statistical data made by the Pew Research Center in 2021 about 63% of the US population is Christian, 28% is Unaffiliated, 2% is Jewish, 1% follows Buddhism, 1% follows Hinduism, 1% follows Islam and 2% follow traditional religions and others. Currently, the United States has the largest Christian population in the world (approximately 230-250 million) and the largest Protestant Christian population (approximately 150-160 million). The country also has the second largest Jewish community in the world (after Israel) and the largest Buddhist and Hindu communities in the West, as well as the largest number of followers of Islam in North America. The country has about 64 million non-affiliates (only China and Japan have more).

According to Pew Research Center study released in 2018, by 2040, Islam will surpass Judaism to become the second largest religion in the US due to higher immigration and birth rates.<ref name=Islamization1

Religions of U.S. adults

The United States government does not collect religious data in its census. The survey below, the American Religious Identification Survey (ARIS) 2008, was a random digit-dialed telephone survey of 54,461 American residential households in the contiguous United States. The 1990 sample size was 113,723; 2001 sample size was 50,281.

Adult respondents were asked the open-ended question, "What is your religion, if any?". Interviewers did not prompt or offer a suggested list of potential answers. The religion of the spouse or partner was also asked. If the initial answer was "Protestant" or "Christian" further questions were asked to probe which particular denomination. About one-third of the sample was asked more detailed demographic questions.

Religious Self-Identification of the U.S. Adult Population: 1990, 2001, 2008Figures are not adjusted for refusals to reply; investigators suspect refusals are possibly more representative of "no religion" than any other group.

LGBT population

The 2000 U.S. Census counted same-sex couples in an oblique way; asking the sex and the relationship to the "main householder", whose sex was also asked. Community Marketing & Insights, an organization specializing in analyzing gay demographic data, reported, based on this count in the 2000 census and in the 2000 supplementary survey, that same-sex couples comprised between 1.0% and 1.1% of U.S. couples in 2000. A 2006 report issued by The Williams Institute on Sexual Orientation concluded that the number of same-sex couples in the U.S. grew from 2000 to 2005, from nearly 600,000 couples in 2000 to almost 777,000 in 2005. A 2006 UCLA study reported that 4.1% of Americans aged 18–45 identify as gay, lesbian, or bisexual.

A 2011 report by the Williams Institute estimated that nine million adults identify as gay, lesbian, or bisexual, representing 3.5% of the population over 18. A spokesperson said that, until recently, few studies have tried to distinguish people who had occasionally undertaken homosexual behavior or entertained homosexual thoughts, from people who identified as lesbian or gay. (Older estimates have varied depending on methodology and timing; see Demographics of sexual orientation for a list of studies.)

Foreign-born population
As of 2017, an estimated 44,525,458 residents of the United States were foreign-born, 13.5% of the country's total population. This demographic includes recent as well as longstanding immigrants; statistically Europeans have resided in the US longer than those from other regions with approximately 66% having arrived prior to 2000.

Citizens living abroad

As of April 2015, the U.S. State Department estimated that 8.7 million American citizens live overseas. Americans living abroad are not counted in the U.S. Census unless they are a federal government employees or dependents of a federal employee. A 2010 paper estimated the number of civilian Americans living abroad to be around 4 million. So-called "accidental Americans" are citizens of a country other than the United States who may also be considered U.S. citizens or be eligible for U.S. citizenship under specific laws but are not aware of having such status (or became aware of it only recently).

Income

In 2020, the median household income in the United States was around $67,521, 2.9 percent less than the 2019 median of $69,560 Household and personal income depends on variables such as race, number of income earners, educational attainment and marital status.

Economic class

Social classes in the United States lack distinct boundaries and may overlap. Even their existence (when distinguished from economic strata) is controversial. The following table provides a summary of some prominent academic theories on the stratification of American society:

Generational cohorts
A definitive recent study of US generational cohorts was done by Schuman and Scott (2012) in which a broad sample of adults of all ages was asked, "What world events are especially important to you?" They found that 33 events were mentioned with great frequency. When the ages of the respondents were correlated with the expressed importance rankings, seven (some put 8 or 9) distinct cohorts became evident.

Today the following descriptors are frequently used for these cohorts:
 Lost Generation – born from approximately 1883 to 1900.
 Greatest Generation – born from approximately 1901 to 1927 (in the U.S., this was the "Depression cohort" who fought and won World War II).
 Silent Generation – born from approximately 1928 to 1945 during the Great Depression and World War II. The label was originally applied to people in North America but has also been applied to those in Western Europe, Australasia and South America. It includes most of those who fought during the Korean War.
 Baby boomers (also known as Boomers) – born from 1946 to 1964.
 Generation X – born from approximately 1965 to 1980. In the U.S., some called Xers the "baby bust" generation because of the drop in birth rates following the baby boom.
 Millennials (also known as Generation Y) – born from approximately 1981 to 1996.
 Generation Z (also known as iGeneration, Digital Natives, or Zoomers) – born from approximately 1997 to 2012.
 Generation Alpha – born from approximately the early 2010s to mid-2020s.

U.S. demographic birth cohorts

Subdivided groups are present when peak boom years or inverted peak bust years are present, and may be represented by a normal or inverted bell-shaped curve (rather than a straight curve). The boom subdivided cohorts may be considered as "pre-peak" (including peak year) and "post-peak". The year 1957 was the baby boom peak with 4.3 million births and 122.7 fertility rate. Although post-peak births (such as trailing edge boomers) are in decline, and sometimes referred to as a "bust", there are still a relatively large number of births. The dearth-in-birth bust cohorts include those up to the valley birth year, and those including and beyond, leading up to the subsequent normal birth rate. The baby boom began around 1943 to 1946.

From the decline in U.S. birth rates starting in 1958 and the introduction of the birth control pill in 1960, the Baby Boomer normal distribution curve is negatively skewed. The trend in birth rates from 1958 to 1961 show a tendency to end late in the decade at approximately 1969, thus returning to pre-WWII levels, with 12 years of rising and 12 years of declining birth rates. Pre-war birth rates were defined as anywhere between 1939 and 1941 by demographers such as the Taeuber's, Philip M. Hauser and William Fielding Ogburn.

Demographic statistics

Birth, growth, death rates, and marriage rates

According to the U.S. Census Bureau, in 2021, the population of the United States grew at a slower rate than in any other year since the country's founding. The U.S. population grew only 0.1% from the previous year before. The United States' population has grown by less than one million people for the first time since 1937, with the lowest numeric growth since at least 1900, when the Census Bureau began yearly population estimates. Apart from the previous few years, when population growth plummeted to historically low levels, the slowest pace of increase in the twentieth century occurred between 1918 and 1919, when the influenza epidemic and World War I were both in full swing. Slower population growth has been the norm in the United States for some years, owing to lower fertility and net international migration, as well as rising mortality from an aging population.

To put it another way, since the mid-2010s, births and net international migration have been dropping while deaths have risen. These trends have a cumulative effect of reduced population increase.

The COVID-19 pandemic has accelerated this trend, resulting in a historically slow population increase in 2021.

The growth rate is 0.1% as estimated for 2021.

The birth rate is 11.0 births/1,000 population, as of 2020. This was the lowest birth rate since records began. There were 3,613,647 births in 2020, this was the lowest number of births since 1980. 
11.0 births/1,000 population per year (final data for 2020). 
11.4 births/1,000 population per year (final data for 2019).
In 2020, the CDC reported that there were 1,676,911 marriages in 2020, compared to 2019, there were 2,015,603 marriages. Marriage rates varied significantly by state, ranging from 3.2 marriages/1,000 population in California to 21.0 marriages/1,000 population in Nevada.*

 5.1 marriages/1,000 population per year (provisional data for 2020).
 6.1 marriages/1,000 population per year (provisional data for 2019).
*Rates are based on provisional counts of marriages by state of occurrence

In 2009, Time magazine reported that 40% of births were to unmarried women. The following is a breakdown by race for unwed births: 17% Asian, 29% White, 53% Hispanics (of any race), 66% Native Americans, and 72% Black American.

According to the CDC, in 2020, there were at least, 1,461,121 births to unmarried women. In 2020, 40.5% of births were to unmarried women. The following is breakdown by race for unwed births: 28.4% Non-Hispanic White, 70.4% Non-Hispanic Black, and 52.8% Hispanic (of any race).

The drop in the birth rate from 2007 to 2009 is believed to be associated with the Great Recession.

A study by the Agency for Healthcare Research and Quality (AHRQ) found that more than half (51 percent) of live hospital births in 2008 and 2011 were male.

Per U.S. federal government data released in March 2011, births fell 4% from 2007 to 2009, the largest drop in the U.S. for any two-year period since the 1970s.
Births have declined for three consecutive years, and are now 7% below the peak in 2007. This drop has continued through 2010, according to data released by the U.S. National Center for Health Statistics in June 2011. Numerous experts have suggested that this decline is largely a reflection of unfavorable economic conditions. This connection between birth rates and economic downturns partly stems from the fact that American birth rates have now fallen to levels that are comparable to the Great Depression of the 1930s. Teen birth rates in the U.S. are at the lowest level in U.S. history. In fact, teen birth rates in the U.S. have consistently decreased since 1991 through 2011, except for a brief increase between 2005 and 2007. The other aberration from this otherwise steady decline in teen birth rates is the 6% decrease in birth rates for 15- to 19-year-olds between 2008 and 2009. Despite these years of decrease, U.S. teen birth rates are still higher than in other developed nations. Racial differences prevail with teen birth and pregnancy rates as well. The American Indian/Alaska Native, Hispanic, and non-Hispanic Black teen pregnancy rates are more than double the non-Hispanic white teen birth rate.

For those interested in a look at where the U.S. population is headed over a longer term, the link below to a recent article offers a preliminary overview of census trends. Yes, a multi-racial democracy awaits, if we can keep it, but also a society with significant demographic pitfalls. Here is a quote summarizing key points:These trends include an unprecedented stagnation in population growth, a continued decrease in Americans' geographical mobility, more pronounced population aging, a first-time decline in the size of the white population, and rising racial and ethnic diversity among millennials, Gen Z, and younger groups, which now comprise a majority of the nation's residents.

Unemployment rate (seasonally adjusted)
, the U.S. unemployment rate was 10.2 percent (U3 rate).

, the U.S. unemployment rate was 3.7 percent (U3 rate).

, the U.S. unemployment rate was 3.7 percent (U3 rate).

, the U.S. unemployment rate was 4.3 percent (U3 rate).

, the U.S. unemployment rate was 4.9 percent (U3 rate).

, the U.S. unemployment rate was 5.3 percent (U3 rate).

, the U.S. unemployment rate was 6.2 percent (U3 rate).

The U6 unemployment rate  was 8.6 percent. The U6 unemployment rate counts not only people without work seeking full-time employment (the more familiar U3 rate), but also counts "marginally attached workers and those working part-time for economic reasons." Note that some of these part-time workers counted as employed by U6 could be working as little as an hour a week. And the "marginally attached workers" include those who have become discouraged and stopped looking, but still want to work. The age considered for this calculation is 16 years and over.

Urban Americans have more job opportunities than those in more rural areas. From 2008 to 2018, 72% of the nation's employment growth occurred in cities with more than one million residents, which account for 56% of the overall population.

Mobility
In 2021, 27.1 million Americans said they were living in a different place than a year before, compared to 29.8 million in 2020. This reflects an 8.4% mover rate, the lowest recorded in more than 70 years.

See also

 Demographic history of the United States
 Emigration from the United States
 Historical Statistics of the United States
 Historical racial and ethnic demographics of the United States
 Index of United States–related articles
 Languages of the United States
 Maps of American ancestries
 Outline of the United States
 Places in the United States with notable demographic characteristics
 Urbanization in the United States

Lists

 Births of U.S. states and territories by race/ethnicity
 List of metropolitan areas in the Americas
 List of U.S. states and territories by fertility rate
 List of U.S. states and territories by population
 List of U.S. states and territories by race/ethnicity
 Lists of U.S. cities with non-white majority populations

Income

 Affluence in the United States
 Household income in the United States
 List of highest-income counties in the United States
 List of lowest-income counties in the United States
 Personal income in the United States

Population

 List of metropolitan statistical areas
 List of United States counties and county equivalents
 Office of Management and Budget
 Statistical area (United States) 
Combined statistical area (list)
Core-based statistical area (list)
Metropolitan statistical area (list)
Micropolitan statistical area (list)
 United States urban area (list)

Notes

References

External links

 United States Census Bureau
 New York Times: "Mapping the 2010 U.S. Census"
 2000 Census of Population and Housing United States, U.S. Census Bureau
 Asian-Nation: Demographics of Asian American /2006-07-04-us-population_x.htm?csp=34 Countdown to 300 million
 Census Ancestry Map
 USA Today 2004 Election County by County Map
 Google – public data "Population in the U.S.A."